MedCity may refer to:
 MedCity (London), a collaboration of London's Mayor and the health centres of the three most prestigious academic institutions in the capital
 Med City, a nickname of Rochester, Minnesota